In information theory, given an unknown stationary source  with alphabet A and a sample w from , the Krichevsky–Trofimov (KT) estimator produces an estimate pi(w) of the probability of each symbol i ∈ A. This estimator is optimal in the sense that it minimizes the worst-case regret asymptotically.

For a binary alphabet and a string w with m zeroes and n ones, the KT estimator pi(w) is defined as:

See also

 Rule of succession
 Dirichlet-multinomial distribution

References

Information theory
Data compression